Anders Gernandt may refer to:
Anders Gernandt (politician) (1916–2008), Swedish politician
Anders Gernandt (equestrian) (1920–2000), Swedish horse rider